"The Good Life" is a song by American rock band Weezer, released on October 29, 1996 as the second single from their second studio album, Pinkerton (1996), as well as an EP in Australia. "The Good Life" was rush-released by the record company to try to save the commercially failing album, but was not successful.

Content 
In 1995, Weezer frontman Rivers Cuomo underwent a corrective operation for his leg and was in a leg brace. The brace was debilitatingly painful and inspired the lyrics to the title song. The inside picture in the CD's booklet is an X-ray of Rivers' leg brace.

The B-sides include "I Just Threw Out the Love of My Dreams" (featuring Rachel Haden of That Dog on vocals), a song once intended for Weezer's unreleased album Songs from the Black Hole. The live songs were taken from a set played by the band at Shorecrest High School near Seattle. The school had won a contest and got Weezer to play during lunch in 1997. A very young Daniel Brummel of Ozma can be seen in the upper right side of the EP's cover.

Music video
The song's music video, directed by Jonathan Dayton and Valerie Faris, features a pizza delivery girl (played by Mary Lynn Rajskub) on her route, highlighting the monotony of her job. The music video is noted for its use of simultaneous camera angles appearing on screen as a fractured full image in a technique  jokingly described by Weezer bassist Scott Shriner on the band's March 2004 DVD Video Capture Device as being "so innovative, I've never seen it since." Blink-182's video for their November 2004 single "Always" used a similar technique. The video's directors would go on to cast Mary Lynn Rajskub as Pageant Assistant Pam in their first feature-length motion picture Little Miss Sunshine.

Release 
"The Good Life" single and EP was released in the spring of 1997 at the behest of the band's label DGC. Pinkerton had not received the same response that the group's first eponymous album did, and the single/EP was issued in an attempt to score a hit, but was not successful. The single version was remixed with a more prominent bass track and panned vocals, and was included on the deluxe edition of Pinkerton.

Track listing
Europe and Japan CD single
 "The Good Life" – 4:19
 "Waiting on You" – 4:13
 "I Just Threw Out the Love of My Dreams" – 2:39

Australia EP
 "The Good Life" – 4:19
 "Waiting on You" – 4:13
 "I Just Threw Out the Love of My Dreams" – 2:39
 "The Good Life" (Live Acoustic) – 4:40
 "Pink Triangle" (Live Acoustic) – 4:26

Personnel
Brian Bell – rhythm guitar, backing vocals
Rivers Cuomo – lead vocals, lead guitar, piano, glockenspiel
Matt Sharp – bass guitar, backing vocals
Patrick Wilson – drums, percussion

Charts

References

External links
 
Lyrics for "The Good Life"

Weezer songs
1996 singles
1996 songs
Songs written by Rivers Cuomo
Music videos directed by Jonathan Dayton and Valerie Faris
DGC Records singles